Amphilius kivuensis is a species of catfish in the genus Amphilius. It is found in rivers in the Democratic Republic of the Congo, Rwanda, Burundi, and Tanzania. Its length reaches 10.6 cm.

References 

kivuensis
Fish described in 1933
Taxa named by Jacques Pellegrin
Freshwater fish of Central Africa